Sweetwater Creek is a  stream in the U.S. state of Georgia, west of Atlanta.  It begins in southwestern Paulding County, flowing generally eastward into southwestern Cobb County, then turning south into eastern Douglas County.  It is a tributary of the Chattahoochee River, and near its end it is the centerpiece of Sweetwater Creek State Park.

Sweetwater Creek was named after AmaKanasta (Sweet Water), a Cherokee chieftain.

The identifier for this gauge is AUSG1. 

Major flooding occurred here in July 2005, after Hurricane Dennis dumped enormous amounts of rain across the Sweetwater Creek watershed, just after it had been soaked by Hurricane Cindy a few days before.  The creek rose to one of its highest levels ever, flooding dozens of homes well beyond what was considered the 100-year flood plain.  About  of rain fell at the gauge before it was ruined by the flood.

In late September 2009, the worst flooding ever occurred on the creek, after days of heavy rain. New records were set, and many roads were left underwater by it, including Interstate 20, which was closed west of I-285 for nearly three days. The USGS stated that it was greater than a 500-year flood (it does not try to make any greater estimates).

Tributaries
Jack's Branch
Beaver Run Creek
Buttermilk Creek
Noses Creek
Olley Creek
Ward Creek
Powder Springs Creek
Gothards Creek
Mill Creek
Mud Creek
Little Creek
Turkey Creek

References

External links

Sweetwater Creek State Park

2Sweetwater
Rivers of Cobb County, Georgia
Rivers of Douglas County, Georgia
Rivers of Paulding County, Georgia
Rivers of Georgia (U.S. state)